Matsyapuri is a Major village in the Veeravasaram mandal of the West Godavari district, near Narsapur, in Andhra Pradesh, India.

Demographics

 India census, Matsyapuri had a population of 5,123. Males constitute 51% of the population and females 49%. Matsyapuri has an average literacy rate of 72%, higher than the national average of 59.5%: male literacy is 78%, and female literacy is 71%. In Matsyapuri, 11% of the population is under 6 years of age.

References 

Villages in West Godavari district